The men's 1 kilometre time trial competition at the 1998 Asian Games was held on 14 December at Huamark Velodrome.

Schedule
All times are Indochina Time (UTC+07:00)

Results 
Legend
DNS — Did not start

References

External links 
Results

Track Men Time Trial